The 2018 Brickyard 400, branded as Big Machine Vodka 400 at the Brickyard, is a Monster Energy NASCAR Cup Series race held on September 10, 2018 at Indianapolis Motor Speedway in Speedway, Indiana. It is the 25th running of the Brickyard 400. Contested over 160 laps on the  speedway, it was the 26th race of the 2018 Monster Energy NASCAR Cup Series season, and the final race of the regular season before the playoffs.

The race was notable for being the first time in NASCAR's modern era (since 1973) that all track activity prior to the race was cancelled by rain and for the race itself to be delayed to Monday, where it was won by Brad Keselowski's Team Penske Ford.

First career points without Kasey Kahne since the 2003 Ford 400.

Report

Background

The Indianapolis Motor Speedway, located in Speedway, Indiana, (an enclave suburb of Indianapolis) in the United States, is the home of the Indianapolis 500 and the Brickyard 400.

Constructed in 1909, it is the original speedway, the first racing facility so named. It has a permanent seating capacity estimated at 235,000 with infield seating raising capacity to an approximate 400,000. It is the highest-capacity sports venue in the world.

Entry list

Notes
 Regan Smith replaced Kasey Kahne in the No. 95 Leavine Family Racing Chevrolet after the latter stood down due to an ongoing hydration issue that came to a head at the Southern 500 the weekend prior.

Practice
Both practice sessions for Saturday were cancelled due to rain.

Qualifying
Qualifying for Saturday was cancelled due to rain and Kyle Busch, the point leader, was awarded the pole as a result.

Starting Lineup

Race

Stage Results

Stage 1
Laps: 50

Stage 2
Laps: 50

Final Stage Results

Stage 3
Laps: 60

Race statistics
 Lead changes: 9 among different drivers
 Cautions/Laps: 10 for 39
 Red flags: 0
 Time of race: 3 hours, 6 minutes and 35 seconds
 Average speed:

Media

Television
NBC Sports covered the race on the television side. The broadcast was produced similarly to NBC's Watkins Glen International race broadcasts. Rick Allen and Steve Letarte had the call in the booth for the race. Motor Racing Network broadcaster Mike Bagley called from Turn 2, Dale Earnhardt Jr. called from Turn 3, and Jeff Burton called from Turn 4. Dave Burns, Parker Kligerman, Marty Snider and Kelli Stavast reported from pit lane during the race.

Radio
Indianapolis Motor Speedway Radio Network and the Performance Racing Network jointly co-produced the radio broadcast for the race, which was simulcast on Sirius XM NASCAR Radio, and aired on IMS or PRN stations, depending on contractual obligations.  The lead announcers and two pit reporters were PRN staff, while the turns and two pit reporters were from IMS.

Standings after the race

Drivers' Championship standings after Playoffs reset

Manufacturers' Championship standings

Note: Only the first 16 positions are included for the driver standings.

References

2018 Brickyard 400
2018 Monster Energy NASCAR Cup Series
2018 in sports in Indiana
September 2018 sports events in the United States